Ruisi  is a village in Kareli District of Shida Kartli region of the Republic of Georgia. Situated about 3 km from the district administrative center Kareli and 10 km from the city of Gori, Ruisi is one of the oldest centers of Christianity in Georgia. The bishop of Ruisi was mentioned already in the beginning of 6th century. The Ruisi cathedral dates back to the 8th century.

References

Populated places in Shida Kartli